Wadi Abu Jamil is the former Jewish quarter in Beirut, Lebanon, located in the city's central district.

History
Formally known as Wadi al-Yahoud (meaning "Valley of the Jews"), the quarter was the center of the Lebanese Jewish community, with Beirut's largest and most important synagogue, the Maghen Abraham Synagogue, located there. The neighborhood was home to Lebanon's centuries-old Jewish community and also for the more recent Jewish refugees from Syria and Iraq.

Emigration from the community began in earnest after the 1967 Arab-Israeli war. During the 1982 Lebanon War, Yasir Arafat's PLO forces took over much of the neighborhood, which was located along the dividing line between the two sides of the Lebanese Civil War. During the war, Israeli bombardment damaged the Magen Abraham Synagogue.

The area today is home to around 29 Lebanese Jews, mostly elderly.

Synagogue renovation
Renovation of the Maghen Abraham Synagogue began in the summer of 2009.  Funding for the renovation includes donations from the Lebanese Jewish Community Council and Jewish Lebanese living overseas.  Isaac Arazi, the leader of the Jewish community in Lebanon has  managed to raise $40,000 from private donors. Renovation is estimated to cost between $1 million and $1.5 million.  Solidere, the Lebanese joint-stock company responsible for much of Central Beirut’s reconstruction, has donated $150,000 toward the renovation effort. Lebanese architect Nabil Gholam has played an important role in the redevelopment planning process.

See also
Beirut Central District
History of the Jews in Lebanon

References

 Karam, Dima (October 2003), Beirut Synagogue is a Reminder of a Departed People, Daily Star. 
 Hendler, Sefi (19 August 2006), Beirut’s last Jews, Ynetnews.

External links
Maghen Abraham Congregation: Sephardic Jewish Lebanese community in Canada
Wadi Hills

Jewish communities
Jews and Judaism in Beirut
Neighbourhoods of Beirut